FWVGA is an abbreviation for Full Wide Video Graphics Array which refers to a display resolution of 854x480 pixels.  854x480 is approximately the 16:9 aspect ratio of anamorphically "un-squeezed" NTSC DVD widescreen video and considered a "safe" resolution that does not crop any of the image. It is called Full WVGA to distinguish it from other, narrower WVGA resolutions which require cropping 16:9 aspect ratio high-definition video (i.e. it is full width, albeit with considerable reduction in size). Since a pixel must be a whole number, rounding up to 854 ensures inclusion of the entire image.

The following is a list of smartphones which incorporate FWVGA displays.

Cloudfone Geo 401q+
Alcatel one touch idol MINI (OT-6012)
Archos 43
Cherry Mobile Me Pop
Cherry Mobile Thunder 2.0
Gigabyte GSmart G1362
Huawei M886 Mercury
Huawei u8860
Huawei Ascend Y550 LTE
Huawei Y3 II
Lenovo A526
LG GD880 Mini
Oppo A59
Micromax A100
Micromax A110
Micromax A74 Canvas Fun
Motorola Bravo
Motorola Defy
Motorola Droid | Sholes | Tao | A855 | Milestone A853
Motorola Droid 2 | Milestone 2 (A953)
Motorola Droid X
Motorola Motoluxe XT685
Motorola Razr D3 it appears some versions of this phone are FWVGA and some are WVGA.
Multilaser MS50
Nokia C1 (2020).
Nokia Lumia 630
Nokia N9
Peace Mobile by Dr.Zakir Naik
QMobile Noir i2 Power
QMobile Noir A10
QMobile Noir A500
Sony Xperia M
Sony Ericsson Xperia X10
Sony Ericsson Xperia Arc
Sony Ericsson Xperia Play
Sony Ericsson Xperia Neo
Sony Ericsson Xperia Pro
Sony Ericsson Xperia ray
Sony Ericsson Xperia neo V
Sony Xperia U
Sony Xperia Sola
Sony Xperia Neo L
Sony Xperia J
Sony Xperia L
Torque Droidz Wave
Wiko Cink King

See also
Graphic display resolutions
List of mobile phones with WVGA display; FWVGA (854x480) is a subset of WVGA (e.g. 800x480, 848x480, or 854x480).

References

Mobile specification

FWVGA display